Vergas may refer to:

Battle of Vergas, June 1826
Vergas, Minnesota, United States